Żabiński or Zabinsky (feminine Żabińska) is a Polish surname. Notable people with this name include:

Antonina Żabińska (1908–1971), writer who sheltered hundreds of Jews in the holocaust, married to Jan
Jan Żabiński (1897–1974), zookeeper who sheltered hundreds of Jews in the holocaust, married to Antonina
Józef Żabiński (1860–1928), Polish chess player
Zelda Zabinsky, American industrial engineer